The 1990 Giro d'Italia was the 73rd edition of the race. It started off in Bari on May 18 with a  individual time trial. The race came to a close with a mass-start stage that began and ended in Milan on June 6. Twenty-two teams entered the race, which was won by the Italian Gianni Bugno of the Château d'Ax–Salotti team. Second and third respectively were the Frenchman Charly Mottet and the Italian rider, Marco Giovannetti. Bugno wore the pink jersey as leader in the general classification from the first to the last stage (before him, only Girardengo in 1919, Binda in 1927 and Merckx in 1973 achieved the same).

In addition to the general classification, Gianni Bugno also won the points classification. In the race's other classifications, Vladimir Poulnikov of the Alfa Lum–BFB Bruciatori team completed the Giro as the best neo-professional in the general classification, finishing in fourth place overall;  rider Claudio Chiappucci won the mountains classification, and  rider Phil Anderson won the intergiro classification.  finished as the winners of the Trofeo Fast Team classification, ranking each of the twenty-two teams contesting the race by lowest cumulative time.

Teams

Twenty-two teams were invited by the race organizers to participate in the 1990 edition of the Giro d'Italia, ten of which were based outside of Italy. The starting riders came from a total of 20 different countries; Italy (89), Spain (24), France (20), Switzerland (12), and the Netherlands (11) all had more than 10 riders. Each team sent a squad of nine riders, which meant that the race started with a peloton of 198 cyclists. Of these, 92 were riding the Giro d'Italia for the first time. The average age of riders was 26.85 years, ranging from 21–year–old Florido Barale to 39–year–old Pierino Gavazzi.

The teams entering the race were:

Pre-race favorites

Reigning champion Laurent Fignon returned to defend his title and was seen as a favorite to win despite a sub–par Classics season. Marco Giovannetti who won the Vuelta a España a few weeks prior was seen as a contender. He was seen as one of the better Italian riders with a chance to win the overall, while it was noted that it would be difficult to win the Giro and Vuelta in the same season as only two riders – Eddy Merckx (1973) and Giovanni Battaglin (1981) – had accomplished that prior. Milan–San Remo winner Gianni Bugno entered the race and writers considered him a contender, others wrote him off as Classics rider. La Repubblica mentioned that he could be the new Francesco Moser. 's Charly Mottet due to his recent victory in the Tour de Romandie also received consideration as a favorite. For the 1990 season, Mottet altered his normal schedule to include the Giro d'Italia and not ride the Critérium du Dauphiné Libéré.

Other riders that received attention as contenders were Steven Rooks, Urs Zimmermann, and Gert-Jan Theunisse. Rooks and Theunisse were expected to make their presence known in the final week of racing. Spanish rider Marino Lejaretta was thought to be the best Spanish rider to make a run during the three weeks. Reigning world road race champion Greg LeMond entered the race in poor form and without and high placings. IT was reported that LeMond had been recovering from a viral illness two months prior. Polish rider Zenon Jaskuła was seen as a rider who had a chance to place high.

Twenty–seven year old Adriano Baffi was thought to be the premier sprinter in the race. The strongest team in the race was thought to be  as they had won 26 races before the start of the Giro. Former winner Stephen Roche and Pedro Delgado chose not to participate in the Giro in favor of racing the Tour de France. Moreno Argentin and Maurizio Fondriest did not participate either. Mexican Raúl Alcalá who recently won the Trump Tour chose to ride the Tour over the Giro.

Route and stages

The route for the 1990 edition of the Giro d'Italia was revealed to the public on television by head organizer Vincenzo Torriani on 16 December 1989 in Milan. In order to avoid overlap with the World Cup held in Italy, the race was moved forward a week and two stages were removed. It contained three time trial events, all of which were individual. There were eleven stages containing categorized climbs, of which four had summit finishes: stage 3, to Mount Vesuvius; stage 7, to Vallombrosa; stage 16, to Passo Pordoi; and stage 17, to Aprica. Another stage with a mountain-top finish was stage 19, which consisted of a climbing time trial to Sacro Monte di Varese. The organizers chose to not include any rest days. When compared to the previous year's race, the race was 336 km  longer, contained the same amount of rest days, and one less individual time trial. In addition, this race contained the same number of half stages, one, as the year before. The event traveled into the neighboring Austria when the race reached the Dolomites, specifically into Klagenfurt.

The route was found to be balanced with five summit finishes and three time trials, while the difficult parts had adequate rest in between. There were thought to be chances for puncheurs and traditional sprinters.

Classification Leadership

Five different jerseys were worn during the 1990 Giro d'Italia. The leader of the general classification – calculated by adding the stage finish times of each rider, and allowing time bonuses for the first three finishers on mass-start stages – wore a pink jersey. This classification is the most important of the race, and its winner is considered as the winner of the Giro.

For the points classification, which awarded a purple (or cyclamen) jersey to its leader, cyclists were given points for finishing a stage in the top 15; additional points could also be won in intermediate sprints. The green jersey was awarded to the mountains classification leader. In this ranking, points were won by reaching the summit of a climb ahead of other cyclists. Each climb was ranked as either first, second or third category, with more points available for higher category climbs. The Cima Coppi, the race's highest point of elevation, awarded more points than the other first category climbs. The Cima Coppi for this Giro was the Passo Pordoi. It was crossed twice by the riders, for the first climbing of the mountain, Italian Maurizio Vandelli was the first over the climb, while Charly Mottet was first over the second passing. The white jersey was worn by the leader of young rider classification, a ranking decided the same way as the general classification, but considering only neo-professional cyclists (in their first three years of professional racing).

The intergiro classification was marked by a blue jersey. The calculation for the intergiro is similar to that of the general classification, in each stage there is a midway point that the riders pass through a point and where their time is stopped. As the race goes on, their times compiled and the person with the lowest time is the leader of the intergiro classification and wears the blue jersey. Although no jersey was awarded, there was also one classification for the teams, in which the stage finish times of the best three cyclists per team were added; the leading team was the one with the lowest total time.

The rows in the following table correspond to the jerseys awarded after that stage was run.

Final standings

General classification

Points classification

Mountains classification

Young rider classification

Intergiro classification

Combativity classification

Intermediate sprints classification

Traguardo Italia '90 classification

Traguardi Fiat Uno classification

Team classification

References

Citations

 
G
Giro d'Italia
Giro d'Italia by year
May 1990 sports events in Europe
June 1990 sports events in Europe